Trachyboa boulengeri, commonly known as the northern eyelash boa, is a species of nonvenomous snake in the family Tropidophiidae. The species is endemic to Central America.

Etymology
The specific name, boulengeri, is in honor of Belgian-born British herpetologist George Albert Boulenger.

Geographic range
T. boulengeri is found in Colombia, western Ecuador, and Panama.

Habitat
It is usually found near freshwater flooded areas, irrigation ditches, and rivers.

Diet
T. boulengeri preys on frogs and fishes.

Reproduction
T. boulengeri is viviparous.

References

Further reading
Lehmann HD (1970). "Beobachtungen bei der Haltung und Aufzucht von Trachyboa boulengeri (Serpentes, Boidae) [= Observations on the Keeping and Rearing of Trachyboa boulengeri (Serpentes, Boidae)]". Salamandra 6: (1–2): 32–42, 6 figures. (in German, with an abstract in English, and bilingual captions).
Peracca MG (1910). "Descrizione di alcune nuove specie di ofidii del Museo Zoologico della R.a Università di Napoli ". Annuario del Museo Zoologico della R[egi].a Università di Napoli, Series 3, 12: 1–3. (Trachyboa boulengeri, new species). (in Italian).

Tropidophiidae
Reptiles of Colombia
Reptiles of Ecuador
Reptiles of Panama
Reptiles described in 1910
Taxa named by Mario Giacinto Peracca
Snakes of Central America